Joseph John Andrew Garcia  is a Gibraltarian historian and politician, and the current leader of the Liberal Party of Gibraltar (LPG) and Deputy Chief Minister of the Government of Gibraltar. The LPG controls three of the 17 seats in the Gibraltar Parliament after the 2011 general election and is in government with its political allies, the Gibraltar Socialist Labour Party (GSLP).

Education
Garcia graduated from the University of Hull in England with a first class honours degree in history and obtained a doctorate on "The Political and Constitutional Development of Gibraltar".

Political career
Garcia has been leader of the LPG since 1992 and was first elected to the then Gibraltar House of Assembly on a by-election. He served as Shadow Minister for Tourism and Commercial Affairs from 1999 to 2000. He was re-elected at the 2000 election and served as Shadow Minister for Trade, Industry, Tourism and Financial Services until 2003.  In 2011 Garcia was appointed Vice President of Liberal International. Garcia's party then formed a coalition to contest the 2003 election with the GSLP, which won five seats, re-electing Garcia to serve as Shadow Minister for Trade, Industry, Tourism and Heritage until 2007 when he was again re-elected at the 2007 election serving in the same Shadow Ministry.

After 12 years in opposition, Garcia was elected into Government following the election of 8 December 2011. The newly elected GSLP Chief Minister of Gibraltar, Fabian Picardo, appointed Garcia Deputy Chief Minister with responsibility for planning and lands, political, democratic and civic reform, and civil aviation.

During the general election campaign in 1996 Garcia ripped up the GSLP manifesto during a leaders debate programme on GBC. His party now forms the Government with the GSLP.

Garcia supports Panorama which is a daily newspaper in Gibraltar. His father Joe is the founder and editor of the paper.

Garcia was appointed Companion of the Order of St Michael and St George (CMG) in the 2021 Birthday Honours for services to politics and public service in Gibraltar.

References

See also

 List of Gibraltarians
 Politics of Gibraltar

Living people
Year of birth missing (living people)
Liberal Party of Gibraltar politicians
Government ministers of Gibraltar
Gibraltarian historians
Companions of the Order of St Michael and St George